Vodenica may refer to:

 Vođenica, a village in Bosnia and Herzegovina
 Vodenica (mountain), a mountain in Croatia